The 2020 FIBA Under-17 Basketball World Cup (Bulgarian: 2020 Световна купа по баскетбол FIBA до 17 години) would have been the 6th edition of the FIBA Under-17 Basketball World Cup, the biennial international men's youth basketball championship contested by the U17 national teams of the member associations of FIBA. 

It was originally scheduled to take place between 4 and 12 July 2020, and hosted by Sofia, Bulgaria. However, due to the COVID-19 pandemic, it was postponed to 15 to 23 August. On 12 June 2020, FIBA postponed the tournament again and options were examined to play in 2021, but the tournament was eventually cancelled.

Venues

Qualified teams

As the Asian tournament was cancelled, the FIBA used the World rankings to decide the participants. Japan and New Zealand were to play a play-off to decide the last participant as they are equal on points.

Draw
The draw for the tournament was held on 6 March 2020 in Sofia, Bulgaria.

Seedings
The seedings were announced on 6 March 2020.

Preliminary round

Group A

Group B

Group C

Group D

Final round

Bracket

9–16th classification playoffs

5–8th classification playoffs

Final ranking

References

External links
Official website

2020
2020 in youth sport
International youth basketball competitions hosted by Bulgaria
2020
2020 in basketball
2020 in Bulgarian sport
Basketball events cancelled due to the COVID-19 pandemic